Manav Thakkar is an Indian  table-tennis player.

He was a part of the Indian team for the India at the 2018 Asian Games. Manav Thakkar was born in Rajkot, Gujarat. As of May 2020, Thakkar holds the number 1 position in ITTF World Under-21 Men Singles Rankings.

References 

Indian male table tennis players
Living people
2000 births
Table tennis players at the 2018 Asian Games
Asian Games medalists in table tennis
Asian Games bronze medalists for India
Medalists at the 2018 Asian Games
People from Rajkot
21st-century Indian people